The Nigeria women's national under-18 and under-19 basketball team is a national basketball team of Nigeria, administered by the Nigeria Basketball Federation.
It represents the country in international under-18 and under-19 (under age 18 and under age 19) women's basketball competitions.

See also
Nigeria women's national basketball team
Nigeria women's national under-17 basketball team
Nigeria men's national under-19 basketball team

References

External links
Archived records of Nigeria team participations

Basketball in Nigeria
Basketball teams in Nigeria
Women's national under-19 basketball teams
Basketball